Pilot Knob may refer to:

Places in the United States
 Pilot Knob, Indiana
 Pilot Knob, Missouri
 Pilot Knob, New York
 Pilot Knob, Texas
 Pilot Knob, Wisconsin
 Pilot Knob Station, a former stage station of the Butterfeild Overland Mail near Andrade, California
 Pilot Knob Township, Washington County, Illinois

Landforms and parks

 Pilot Knob (Fresno County, California)
 Pilot Knob (Imperial County, California)
 Pilot Knob (Colorado), a summit in the San Juan Mountains of Colorado
 Pilot Knob, a high mountain summit in the Elkhead Mountains of Colorado
 Pilot Knob State Park, near Forest City, Iowa
 Pilot Knob State Nature Preserve, Powell County, Kentucky
 Oheyawahi-Pilot Knob, on the National Register of Historic Places listings in Dakota County, Minnesota
 Pilot Knob (Iron County, Missouri), Iron, Missouri
 Pilot Knob (Austin, Texas)
 Pilot Knob Mountain, a tank gunnery range at Fort Hood, Texas

See also
 Battle of Pilot Knob, in Missouri
 Camp Pilot Knob, a U.S. Army camp in Riverside County, California
 Pilot Butte (disambiguation)
 Pilot Hill (disambiguation)
 Pilot Mountain (disambiguation)
 Pilot Peak (disambiguation)